Dinelli is an Italian surname. Notable people with the surname include:

 Leonardo Martins Dinelli (born 1977), Brazilian footballer
 Mel Dinelli (1912–1991), American writer for theatre, radio, film and magazines

See also 
 Dinelli's doradito, a species of bird in the family Tyrannidae
 Dini (disambiguation)

Italian-language surnames